American Idol Season 11 Highlights is a compilation extended play by Skylar Laine based on some of her American Idol performances. The EP was released exclusively through Walmart and consists of a few studio recordings made by Laine during season 11 of American Idol.  It includes a duet with Colton Dixon and performances that were well received by the judges on the show. Similar EPs were also released through Walmart by fellow contestants from the Top 5, Phillip Phillips, Jessica Sanchez, Joshua Ledet and Hollie Cavanagh. As of September 2012, it has sold 33,000 copies.

Track listing

Charts

References

2012 EPs
Skylar Laine EPs